Albert Francis Zahm (1862–1954) was an early aeronautical experimenter, a professor of physics, and a chief of the Aeronautical Division of the U.S. Library of Congress.
He testified as an aeronautical expert in the 1910–14 lawsuits between the Wright brothers and Glenn Curtiss.

Time line of early life and work in aeronautics
 Received A.B., University of Notre Dame, Indiana, 1883, A.M., 1885, M.S. 1890; M.E. Cornell University, 1892; Ph.D., Johns Hopkins University, 1898. Albert's brother John was on the Notre Dame faculty while Albert was a student there.
 Professor of Mathematics, University of Notre Dame 1885-1889, mathematics and mechanics, 1890-1892.
 Zahm suggested to Octave Chanute to stage an International Conferences on Aerial Navigation in 1893. Zahm acted as Secretary, with Chanute as Chair.
 He was a professor of mechanics (physics) at The Catholic University of America, from 1895 apparently until 1913-1914 (but one source says only till 1908).
 In 1901, as part of a pioneering aeronautical laboratory, Zahm built a wind tunnel with financing from Hugo Mattullah. It operated until 1908. It has been described as "America's first significant wind tunnel."
 He joined the Aero Club of America shortly after it was founded, in 1905.
 Zahm's 1911 book Aerial Navigation described the historical development of experimental aircraft that led to functional airplanes.

Testimony in Wrights vs. Curtiss
Zahm testified as an aeronautical expert in the 1910-1913 patent lawsuits by the Wright brothers who alleged patent infringement against inventor and manufacturer Glenn Curtiss. His testimony took over a month. He testified on behalf of the Curtiss after declining to testify for the Wrights, possibly because the Wrights refused to pay Zahm to appear as an expert witness whereas the Curtiss interests did. Zahm had been on friendly terms with both sides previously but became a long term adversary of the Wrights during and after the trial. He worked closely with Glenn Curtiss on the controversial 1914 flying tests of the (substantially rebuilt and modified) Langley Aerodrome in an attempt to show that Langley's machine had been capable of powered flight with a man aboard before the Wrights' glider was.

Zahm testified that earlier experimental gliders and glider designs and publications, before those of the Wrights, had included a variety of monoplane and biplane designs, with horizontal and vertical rudders, and steering concepts of ailerons and wing warping. There were complex technical issues, notably whether Curtiss's airplanes used a vertical rudder and ailerons in ways that closely matched the patented design of the Wrights. Experts testified on both sides and sometimes contradicted one another on matters of fact. In the end judge John R. Hazel ruled in Feb. 1913 for the Wrights, and on appeal a higher court agreed with this decision in 1914.

Later years
Zahm became the chief research engineer of Curtiss Aeroplane Company in 1914-1915 and then the director of the U.S. Navy's Aerodynamical Laboratory, 1916-1929.

Zahm became the chief of the Aeronautical Division at the Library of Congress from 1929 or 1930 until 1946, and held the Guggenheim Chair of Aeronautics there.

Zahm died in 1954, and was buried in the Community Cemetery, Notre Dame, Indiana.

Honors
 Zahm was invited to be a member of the Cosmos Club of Washington, DC, and received his mail there while on the faculty of Catholic University.
 Recipient of Laetare medal at University of Notre Dame, 1925.
 Awarded the Mendel Medal at Villanova College in 1930 for his pioneering work in scientific aeronautics.
 Daniel Guggenheim Chair of Aeronautics in the Library of Congress, 1929-1946.

Publications, bibliography and archival information

More than 100 of his articles and papers were collected in Aeronautical papers 1885-1945 of Albert F. Zahm, volumes I and II.
He wrote the book Aerial Navigation (1911), and a booklet called Early Powerplane Fathers. His papers are kept by the University of Notre Dame.

References

External links
 
 
 

1954 deaths
Cornell University College of Engineering alumni
Catholic University of America faculty
Johns Hopkins University faculty
University of Notre Dame faculty
University of Notre Dame alumni
Gliding in the United States
Aerodynamicists
Wright brothers
Aviation pioneers
Aviation inventors
1862 births
Laetare Medal recipients